Early histories of a war typically describe the war as it was declared by the states involved. It is not uncommon for later historians to group together a series of wars over a long period or spread over several theaters as part of a broader conflict or strategic campaign. The most familiar of these in the present day is probably the Cold War and the War on Terror, which included the Korean War (1950–1953) (Cold War), the Vietnam War (1965–1973) (Cold War), the Persian Gulf War (1990–1991) (Cold War), the War in Afghanistan (2001–2021) (War on Terror), and the Iraq War (2003–2011) (War on Terror) to name these five wars during the Cold War and the War on Terror. These groupings provide useful context for the wars involved. Note that some groupings overlap time periods and its possible for more than one war to be going on at the same time.

Afro-Eurasia
499 BC – 448 BC Greco-Persian Wars
322 BC - 275 BC Wars of the Diadochi
274 BC - 168 BC Syrian Wars
264 BC – 146 BC Punic Wars
66 BC – 628 AD Roman–Persian Wars
66 BC - 217 AD Roman–Parthian Wars
230–392 Roman–Sasanian wars
392–628 Byzantine–Sasanian wars
66–136 Jewish–Roman wars
485–556 Samaritan revolts
622–755 Early Muslim conquests
629–11th century Arab–Byzantine wars
650s–737 Arab–Khazar wars
680–1355 Byzantine–Bulgarian wars
718–1492 Iberian Reconquista
830s–1043 Rus'–Byzantine wars
1048–1308 Byzantine–Seljuq wars
1090–1194 Nizari–Seljuk conflicts
1095–1291 Crusades
1299–1453 Byzantine–Ottoman wars
1676–1918 Russo-Turkish wars
1689–1815 Second Hundred Years' War
1722–1828 Russo-Persian Wars
1919–1923 Turkish War of Independence

Africa
1955–present Sudanese civil wars
1996–present Congo wars

Asia
133 BC–89 AD Han–Xiongnu War
109 BC–108 BC Gojoseon–Han War
220–280 Wars of the Three Kingdoms (China)
588–630 Göktürk–Persian wars
598–614 Goguryeo–Sui Wars
629-630 Tang conquest of the Eastern Turks
645–668 Goguryeo–Tang Wars
657 Tang conquest of the Western Turks
1206–1279 Mongol invasion of China
1231–1259 Mongol invasions of Korea
1274–1281 Mongol invasions of Japan
1592–1598 Japanese invasions of Korea
1627–1636 Manchu invasions of Korea
1747–1793 Ten Great Campaigns
1839–1860 Opium Wars: First Opium War (18391842) and Second Opium War (18561860)
1894–1945 Sino-Japanese wars
1902-1932 Unification Wars of Arabia
1920–present Kurdish rebellions in Turkey
1930–1939 Soviet–Japanese border conflicts
1941–1945 Pacific War also includes a small piece of Oceania Region but mainly an Asian war.
1947–present Indo-Pakistani wars and conflicts and Kashmir conflict
1948–present Arab–Israeli conflict
1950–1953 Korean War
1955–1975 Vietnam War
1961-1997 Iraqi–Kurdish conflict
1962 Sino-Indian War
1978–present Afghan Civil War

Americas and Europe
1607–1890 Kingdom of England, and United States, versus Native Americans
1689–1763 French and Indian Wars
1754–1814 Sixty Years' War
1860-1877 American Civil War and Reconstruction Era (re-admitting States to the Union)

Europe
58 BC – 50 BC Gallic Wars
1142–1445 Swedish–Novgorodian Wars
1296–1363 Wars of Scottish Independence
1135–1453 Wars between the kingdom of England and the French 
1337–1453 Hundred Years' War
1438–1552 Russo-Kazan Wars
1455–1485 Wars of the Roses
1494–1559 Italian Wars
1496–1809 Russo-Swedish wars
1507–1572 Russo-Crimean Wars
1562–1598 French Wars of Religion
1637–1652 Wars of the Three Kingdoms (Europe)
1648–1667 The Deluge
1754–1763 Seven Years' War
1792–1802 French Revolutionary Wars
1848–1866 Italian Independence wars
1912–1913 Balkan Wars
1941–1944 Continuation War (Finland-USSR)
1941–1945 Great Patriotic War 
1991–2001 Yugoslav Wars

World Wars
1914–1918 World War I
1939–1945 World War II
1947–1991 Cold War
2001–2021 War on Terror

Military conflicts spanning multiple wars